The 2021 Rally Catalunya (also known as the RallyRACC Catalunya - Costa Daurada 2021) was a motor racing event for rally cars that held over four days between 14 and 17 October 2021. It marked the fifty-sixth running of the Rally de Catalunya. The event was the tenth round of the 2021 World Rally Championship, World Rally Championship-2 and World Rally Championship-3. It also hosted as the final round of the 2021 Junior World Rally Championship. The 2021 event was based in Salou in the province of Tarragona in Catalonia and was contested over seventeen special stages totalling  in competitive distance.

Thierry Neuville and Nicolas Gilsoul were the defending rally winners. Their team, Hyundai Shell Mobis WRT, were the defending manufacturers' winners. However, Gilsoul did not defend his title as Neuville changed his co-driver to Martijn Wydaeghe at the start of the season. Mads Østberg and Torstein Eriksen were the defending winners in the WRC-2 category, while Eric Camilli and Benjamin Veillas were the defending winners in the WRC-3 category.

Neuville successfully defended his title with his new co-driver Martijn Wydaeghe. Their team, Hyundai Shell Mobis WRT, successfully defended their titles. In the World Rally Championship-2 category, Eric Camilli and Maxime Vilmot won the event, while Andreas Mikkelsen confirmed to win the WRC-2 title. In the World Rally Championship-3 category, Emil Lindholm and Reeta Hämäläinen took back-to-back victory. In the junior championship, the Finnish crew of Sami Pajari and Marko Salminen won the rally and became the junior rally champions.

Background

Championship standings prior to the event
Reigning World Champions Sébastien Ogier and Julien Ingrassia entered the round with a twenty-four-point lead over Elfyn Evans and Scott Martin. Thierry Neuville and Martijn Wydaeghe were third, a further thirty-six points behind. In the World Rally Championship for Manufacturers, Toyota Gazoo Racing WRT held a massive sixty-one-point lead over defending manufacturers' champions Hyundai Shell Mobis WRT, followed by M-Sport Ford WRT.

In the World Rally Championship-2 standings, Andreas Mikkelsen led Mads Østberg by eight points in the drivers' championship, with Marco Bulacia Wilkinson in third. In the co-drivers' championship Torstein Eriksen held a fourteen-point lead over Marcelo Der Ohannesian, with Ola Fløene in third.

In the World Rally Championship-3 standings, Yohan Rossel led Kajetan Kajetanowicz by fifteen points in the drivers' championship, with Emil Lindholm in third. In the co-drivers' championship, Maciek Szczepaniak held a thirteen-point lead over Alexandre Coria, with Yannick Roche in third.

In the junior championship, Sami Pajari and Marko Salminen led Jon Armstrong and Phil Hall by three points. Mārtiņš Sesks and Renars Francis were third, eleven points further back. In the Nations' standings, Finland held an eight-point lead over United Kingdom and Latvia.

Entry list
The following crews entered the rally. The event was open to crews competing in the World Rally Championship, its support categories, the World Rally Championship-2 and World Rally Championship-3, and privateer entries that were not registered to score points in any championship. Twelve entries for the World Rally Championship were received, as were eight in the World Rally Championship-2 and fifteen in the World Rally Championship-3. A further six crews entered the Junior World Rally Championship in Ford Fiesta Rally4s.

Route

Itinerary
All dates and times are CEST (UTC+2).

Report

World Rally Cars

Classification

Special stages

Championship standings

World Rally Championship-2

Classification

Special stages

Championship standings
Bold text indicates 2021 World Champions.

World Rally Championship-3

Classification

Special stages

Championship standings
Bold text indicates 2021 World Champions.

Junior World Rally Championship

Classification

Special stages

Championship standings
Bold text indicates 2021 World Champions.

Notes

References

External links
  
 2021 Rally Catalunya at eWRC-results.com
 The official website of the World Rally Championship

2021
2021 in Catalan sport
2021 in Spanish motorsport
Spain
October 2021 sports events in Spain